The Sverdrup Channel is an area of sea in the Canadian Arctic Archipelago within the Qikiqtaaluk Region, Nunavut. To the north-west of the channel is Meighen Island, to the east is Axel Heiberg Island, and to the south is Amund Ringnes Island. The Fay Islands are located in the channel.

References 

Channels of Qikiqtaaluk Region